Parrott is the surname of:

 Alice Kagawa Parrott, fiber artist and ceramicist
 Alison Parrott, Canadian missing girl
 Andrew Parrott, British musicologist and conductor
 Big Nose George Parrott, American outlaw
 Buddy Parrott, NASCAR crew chief
 Carroll Parrott Blue, Film maker, author, & Professor
 Cecil Parrott, British diplomat, translator, writer and scholar
 Charles Joseph Parrott, birth name of Charley Chase, American comedian, actor, screenwriter and director
 David Parrott, English cricketer
 Delphine Parrott, British endocrinologist and immunologist
 Edward Parrott, British teacher and author, Member of Parliament
 Eluned Parrott, Welsh politician
 Enoch Greenleafe Parrott, American naval officer  
 George Parrott, American Navy officer in World War I
 Harry Craig Parrott, Canadian politician
 Ian Parrott, British composer
 Jacob Parrott, first recipient of the Medal of Honor for his military service in the American Civil War
 James Parrott, American comic actor and film director
 Jasper Parrott, co-founder and executive chairman of HarrisonParrott Ltd., an artist management company
 Jeff Parrott, Dallas artist
 Jiggs Parrott, former baseball player
 Jim Parrott, Canadian politician
 Joanne S. Parrott, Maryland politician
 John Parrott, English professional snooker player
 John Fabyan Parrott, American Senator from New Hampshire
 Joseph R. Parrott, President of the Florida East Coast Railway
 Kyle Parrott, Canadian long track speed skater
 Les Parrott, author, psychologist, and minister
 Marion A. Parrott, Prominent North Carolinian
 Marcus Junius Parrott, Kansas congressman
 Matt Parrott, American politician and businessman
 Mike Parrott, Major league baseball player
 Neil Parrott, American politician from Maryland 
 Nicki Parrott, Jazz vocalist and bass player from Australia
 Robert Parker Parrott, inventor of the Parrott rifle
 Thomas Alexander Parrott, CIA officer
 Thomas H. Parrott, English musician
 Thomas Marc Parrott, Princeton professor
 Todd Parrott, NASCAR racer
 Tom Parrott, professional baseball player
 Travis Parrott, American professional  tennis player
 Troy Parrott, Irish professional footballer
 Ursula Parrott, American writer of romantic fiction stories and novels
 William Parrott, British coalminer, trade union official and Liberal-Labour politician

English-language surnames